The Kyiv Boryspil Express is an airport rail link in Ukraine between Boryspil International Airport and Kyiv, opened in November 2018. It is operated by Ukrzaliznytsia, Ukraine's state-owned rail operator.

History

Initially, the project was implemented by the State Agency for Investment and Management of National Projects of Ukraine. Financing was provided by Eximbank of China. PricewaterhouseCoopers has developed a business plan for the implementation of the national Air Express project. In 2017, the project was stalled after a string of scandals.

On 16 February 2018, the Cabinet of Ministers of Ukraine allocated funds for the implementation of the project and the works commenced in May. This does not include the price of the rolling stock, only its refurbishment. The Pesa SA rail buses used  had previously operated local rural routes in Ukraine.

At the end of November 2018, all necessary construction works were performed. Parts of the platform of track 14 at Pasazhyrskyi station were heightened to provide easy access to the trains and a new Boryspil Airport station was built some 200 meters north of the airport's Terminal D. The Kyiv-Boryspil Express officially launched on 30 November 2018.

Service
Trains depart/arrive at the 14th track and run every hour (non-peak) or every 30 minutes (peak). Journey time one way is 30–40 minutes.

Tickets cost  and can be purchased at cash desks at both stations, or at self-service terminals installed in Kyiv station concourse. Contactless card payment on-board is also possible.

Stations

Rolling stock

See also
 Gatwick Express

References

External links

 of the Ukrainian Railways
 with timetables
 Boryspil International Airport, official website 
 

Airport rail links
Railway companies established in 2018
Ukrainian Railways
Railway services introduced in 2018
Transport in Kyiv Oblast
Transport in Kyiv